B82 may refer to :
 Sicilian Defence, Scheveningen Variation, according to the list of chess openings 
 Bundesstraße 82, a German road
 B82 (New York City bus) in Brooklyn

B*82 may refer to :
 HLA-B*82, an HLA-B serotype